Canhoba is a municipality located in the Brazilian state of Sergipe. Its population was 4,006 (2020) and its area is 170 km².

References

Municipalities in Sergipe